The Atomic Energy Commission's Historical Advisory Committee was established in February 1958, when the United States Atomic Energy Commission was a decade old and continued until 1974 when the Energy Research and Development Administration (ERDA) and later the United States Department of Energy replaced the commission.

History
In 1957, the United States Atomic Energy Commission appointed Dr Richard G. Hewlett to be the historian of the Atomic Energy Commission. Upon taking up this post, Hewlett proposed the creation of an historical advisory committee for the AEC. His proposal was referred to historians James Phinney Baxter III and Samuel Eliot Morison and Nobel Prize–winning physicist Isidor I. Rabi. These three men recommended the approval of Hewlett's proposal as a means of giving credibility of the AEC Historical Office's work and avoiding self-serving official history.

Chairman
The following is a chronological list of chairmen, 1958–1974. In cases where a chairman also served as a regular member of the committee, his dates of such service are listed in the alphabetical listing of members. 
 James Phinney Baxter III, 1958-1967
 George E. Mowry, 1967-1969
 Alfred D. Chandler, Jr., 1969-1974

Members
The following is an alphabetical listing of members who served on this committee:
 John Morton Blum, 1958-1962
 James L. Cate, 1958-1969
 Thomas C. Cochran, 1973-1974
 A. Hunter Dupree, 1968-1973
 Constance McL. Green, 1964-1969
 Ralph W. Hiddy, 1962-1969
 Thomas P. Hughes, 1973-1974
 Richard S. Kirkendall, 1973-1974
 Richard W. Leopold, 1973-1974
 Ernest R. May, 1969-1973
 George E. Mowry, 1962-1967
 Robert P. Multhauf, 1969-1973

Sources
 Richard W. Leopold, "Historians and the Federal Government: Historical Advisory Committees: State, Defense, and the Atomic Energy Commission," The Pacific Historical Review, vol. 44, No. 3. (Aug 1975), pp. 373–385.

History organizations based in the United States
Defunct agencies of the United States government
United States Department of Energy
Historians of science